The 2009 Indian general election in Puducherry, occurred for 1 seat in the territory. The seat is part of the Puducherry constituency. The UPA, fielded Narayanswamy, of the Indian National Congress, while the Third Front fielded PMK incumbent candidate M. Ramadass. Due to the high Vanniyar population in Puducherry, many expected that it will be a bitter contest, unlike the previous election, when PMK was part of the UPA. The results reflected the general trend shown in Tamil Nadu, where DMK and its alliance UPA, were able to beat its rival ADMK and its allies which are part of the Third Front. The results here also reflects the poor performance of PMK in this election, losing all 7 seats, it contested in Tamil Nadu, as opposed to winning all of its 6 seats in the last election.

Full Results 
Source: Election Commission of India

References

See also 
Brisk polling in Tamil Nadu, Puducherry

Elections in Puducherry
P
2000s in Puducherry